Opountios F.C. is a Greek football club, based in Martino, Phthiotis.

Honors

Domestic Titles and honors
 Phthiotis FCA Champions: 4
 2006–07, 2013–14, 2016–17, 2019-20
 Phthiotis FCA Cup Winners: 1
 2015-16

External links
 http://opountiosmartinou.blogspot.gr/

Association football clubs established in 1952
1952 establishments in Greece
Sport in Phthiotis
Football clubs in Central Greece